Daniel Seland Karlsbakk (born 7 April 2003) is a Norwegian footballer who plays as a forward for Eredivisie club SC Heerenveen.

Career
Karlsbakk began his career in 2009 by joining hometown club Bryne's youth academy, which led to him signing his first professional contract with the club in April 2019. He made his senior debut on 26 October 2019. He suffered an ankle injury in June 2021 while attempting a backflip, which kept him out of action for much of the following season.

On 7 December 2021, Karlsbakk signed a three-year contract with Viking. He made his competitive debut for the club on 21 April 2022 in a Norwegian Football Cup match against Bodø/Glimt and scored his first goal for the club against Haugesund on 25 June 2022.

SC Heerenveen
On 31 January 2023, following the transfer of forward Amin Sarr to Olympique Lyon, Karlsbakk signed a contract with Heerenveen until 2026. He made his debut for the club on 7 February 2023 in the KNVB Cup against NAC Breda  and five days later, he made his Eredivisie debut, coming on as a substitute against Feyenoord.

Personal life
He is a son of former footballer Eivind Karlsbakk. Karlsbakk has compared himself to fellow Brynebu Erling Haaland, claiming that they both possess the same power in their game, which they acquired from their upbringing in Bryne. Additionally, they shared a similar diet including forcemeat.

Career statistics

References

External links

2003 births
Living people
People from Time, Norway
Norwegian footballers
Norway youth international footballers
Bryne FK players
Viking FK players
SC Heerenveen players
Norwegian Second Division players
Norwegian First Division players
Eliteserien players
Association football forwards
Sportspeople from Rogaland
Norwegian expatriate footballers
Expatriate footballers in the Netherlands
Norwegian expatriate sportspeople in the Netherlands